Ramanathan is a South Indian male given name. Due to the South Indian tradition of using patronymic surnames it may also be a surname for males and females. Ramanathan is derived from Rama (a Hindu god) and the Sanskrit word nath, meaning "lord." The name Ramanathan is given to the Hindu god Shiva at Rameshwaram, one of the southernmost towns in India. Hindus believe that Lord Rama worshipped Shiva before beginning his journey to Lanka; hence "Lord of Rama". This name is from the history of great epics.

Notable people

Given name
 Annamalai Ramanathan (1946–1993), Indian mathematician
 Devakottai Ramanathan, Indian comedian
 G. Ramanathan (died 1963), Indian composer
 K. G. Ramanathan (1920–1992), Indian mathematician
 K. R. Ramanathan (1893–1984), Indian physicist and meteorologist
 M. Ramanathan, Indian politician
 M. D. Ramanathan (1923–1984), Indian composer and vocalist
 N. Ramanathan (born 1946), Indian musician and academic
 Pathmanathan Ramanathan (1932–2006), Sri Lankan lawyer and judge
 Ponnambalam Ramanathan (1851–1930), Ceylonese politician
 R. Ramanathan Chettiar (1913–1995), Indian businessman, politician and bureaucrat
 Rama Ramanathan (born 1964), Indian politician
 Ramkumar Ramanathan (born 1994), Indian tennis player
 S. Kumara Kurubara Ramanathan, Indian politician
 S. Ramanathan (1917–1988), musician
 Sellapan Ramanathan (1924–2016), Singaporean politician
 Veerabhadran Ramanathan, Indian climatologist

Surname
 Leelawathy Ramanathan (born 1870), Australian author and publisher
 Ramanathan Indrarajah, Sri Lankan politician
 Ramanathan Gnanadesikan (born 1932), Indian statistician
 Ramanathan Krishnan (born 1937), Indian tennis player
 Ramanathan V. Guha (born 1965), Indian computer scientist
 Ramanathan Sarathkumar (born 1954), Indian film actor, journalist and politician
 Ramkumar Ramanathan (born 1994), Indian tennis player
 Sharada Ramanathan, Indian journalist

See also
 

Tamil masculine given names